In Hawaiian mythology, Mahina is a lunar deity, mother of Hemā. Mahina is also the word for the "Moon" in Hawaiian language.

It is likely that she is the same as the goddess Hina or Lona.

See also 
Mahina, French Polynesia
Hina
Aikanaka, possibly Mahina's husband
List of lunar deities

References

Lunar goddesses
Hawaiian goddesses